T. J. Connolly is an American retired ice hockey defenseman who was an All-American for Boston University.

Career
Connolly arrived at Boston University as the team was going through a lull. While the team was good defensively, the Terrier's offense was pretty poor during Connolly's first two seasons and, as a result, BU missed the postseason both years. The program began to climb back to prominence in Connolly's junior year with improvements on both sides of the puck. While Connolly didn't contribute much offensively, he was able to get squad to allow fewer and fewer goals, helping them to climb up to 6th in ECAC Hockey. The team didn't last long in the postseason, but the Terriers were finally back to playing winning hockey.

Entering his senior season, Connolly was named team captain and led the team to one of its best seasons. BU finished tied for second in the conference standings, equaling the record of hated rival Boston College. The team had one of the top defenses in the country thanks to the work of freshman Cleon Daskalakis and Connolly, both of whom were named as All-Americans. In the ECAC Tournament BU knocked out BC in the semifinal and, though they fell in the championship game, it gave them the better matchup in the team first NCAA Tournament appearance in six years. The Terriers won the opening game 6–3, only to see Bowling Green surge back with a 4–1 lead after regulation. Because the quarterfinals were two-game total-goal series, the teams needed overtime to decide the winner. Unfortunately for Connolly, the final goal came from the Falcons and his college career came to an abrupt end. 

After graduating, Connolly played one year in the IHL before retiring.

Career statistics

Regular season and playoffs

Awards and honors

References

External links

Year of birth missing (living people)
Living people
AHCA Division I men's ice hockey All-Americans
American men's ice hockey defensemen
Boston University Terriers men's ice hockey players
Ice hockey players from Massachusetts
Salt Lake Golden Eagles (IHL) players
Sportspeople from Quincy, Massachusetts